Modred the Mystic is a fictional magician appearing in American comic books published by Marvel Comics. The character has alternated between being an anti-hero and an outright supervillain.

Publication history

Modred the Mystic first appeared in Marvel Chillers #1 and was created by Bill Mantlo, Yong Montano and Marv Wolfman.

Fictional character biography
Modred was born outside London, England in the 6th century. He was a sorcerer who served as an apprentice in magic to the wizard Gervasse. Modred was engaged to Gervasse's daughter, Janice, and was set to become the apprentice of the wizard Merlin. However, Merlin had been replaced by an imposter (who would later go by the names of the Mad Merlin, the Maha Yogi, and Merlin Demonspawn), and Modred and Gervasse knew that "Merlin" needed to be stopped. In order to gain the power necessary for this feat, Modred sought out to master the mystic tome called the Darkhold, the book of black magic created by the Elder God Chthon, in order to use its power for good. The Other, an emissary or avatar of Chthon, offered Modred great power at the cost of his soul. Modred refused until the Other targeted Janice; in order to protect her, Modred offered himself up to Chthon. His soul was corrupted, and Gervasse placed him in suspended animation, where he lay for centuries.

Modred was awakened in the modern day by archaeologists Janet Lyton and Grant Whitaker, who led him to London. There, he was shot by the police and then attacked by the Other, which he defeated. However, he was unwittingly possessed by Chthon. He later assisted the superheroes Spider-Woman and the Thing in battling creations of the false Merlin, who was also active in the modern day. Modred, Thing, and Spider-Woman battled elementals at Stonehenge. At some point afterwards, Modred's mind and soul fell under Chthon's influence again. He took the Scarlet Witch to Chthon's prison under Mount Wundagore under the pretext of revealing her origins to her, for she had been exposed to Chthon's chaos magic upon her birth at Wundagore. Upon reaching Wundagore, Modred subdued the Scarlet Witch and used her as an Earthly host for Chthon. Modred was defeated and his master was exorcised, but only at the cost of the life of the Witch's adoptive father, Django Maximoff. Modred battled the Avengers at Wundagore Mountain, and with Chthon's defeat Modred was mentally damaged by the battle, and was left with the intellect of a child. He lost his sanity and knowledge of magic, and was left in the care of the High Evolutionary's servant Bova, the cow-woman. He later regained his magical powers, and reduced the Thing and the Puppet Master, who were visiting Transia, to doll-size and attacked them with animated toys.

Modred witnessed Magneto's destruction of Bova's cottage. When Bova was injured, Modred wandered away, subconsciously seeking his native England. As he approached his homeland, his mind and power returned, as did his desire to defeat Merlin. Not knowing that the Merlin that he had sought to overthrow was an imposter, he instead targeted the real Merlin's servant on Earth: Captain Britain. He defeated the hero, donned his costume, and then used the costume's power in combination with his own to defeat the visiting Captain America. The two Captains defeated Modred, who was taken to the Otherworld by Merlin. Modred later escaped from Merlin and psychically dominated Phoenix, Captain Britain's teammate in Excalibur, and used her to battle Quasar and Excalibur. Modred and the possessed Phoenix were defeated by Excalibur and Quasar, and Modred was hurled into another dimension by Widget.

After the battle, Modred was exiled from the Earth's dimension, but he eventually regained his self-control and returned to Earth in order to confront Chthon and regain his soul. Back on Earth, he observed the Darkhold Redeemers, a group of normal humans and mystics who were seeking out fragments of the Darkhold. He joined them as their "leader", and defended the group from actual and potential foes, including the N'Garai demons, the Scarlet Witch, and Doctor Strange. Doctor Strange bound Modred to the island of Maui during their battle, leaving him unable to protect his teammates from the Darkhold's "Demogorge" spell. The spell was used by Blade, who was transformed into the Switchblade, a killer of mystical heroes and monsters alike. Switchblade killed Modred, among others, but his victims were restored when the Darkhold Redeemer Louise Hastings cast the Demogorge's counter-spell from the Darkhold and returned Blade to normal.

After Modred's resurrection, the Other's servant, the Dwarf, offered him a chance to regain his own soul if he would obtain a pure soul for Chthon. Modred agreed, and found that soul in an abbey in Bath in the form of an ancient holy woman who had been blinded by age.<red>Darkhold #12 (Sep 1993)</ref> He offered to return her youth and her lost love to her in exchange for her soul. When she agreed, he saw her now-youthful face and realized that she was his long-lost love Janice, and she could see him and realized that he was Modred. The Other appeared to take her soul, but Modred gave his own soul up to save hers, although Janice died in his arms while resisting the demon's power. Modred returned to the Darkhold Redeemers and began training Louise Hastings' son Jinx in the magical arts.

Soon afterwards, the demon-goddess Lilith, her consort Zarathos and their Lilin offspring attacked the Redeemers and the other Midnight Sons. Louise Hastings was killed in the battle by Morbius the Living Vampire, and Modred was falsely accused by his teammates of having set up the attack. Modred and Jinx rendered one another unconscious in the battle, but were able to escape from the Lilin. They led the Redeemers to the home of the Truthsayer, who revealed to Modred that Chthon was about to enter the Earthly realm. Modred was attacked by Metarchus, a relative of the Truthsayer who took on Modred's form in the battle. Modred took advantage of the confusion to kill the Truthsayer, preventing his allies from learning that his true master was about to be reborn on the Earth via the womb of another Darkhold Redeemer, Victoria Montesi. Following Louise's funeral, Modred left Jinx and the other Redeemers.

Modred next took on another disciple, Kyllian, a former apprentice of Doctor Strange who now called himself Wildpride. Modred took mental control over Morbius and the Werewolf by Night, and the four attacked Strange's foe Salome. Modred offered an alliance with her, but she rebuffed him and rendered him unconscious. He was soon abducted by the extra-dimensional Clave alongside Doctor Strange's mystical doppelganger and the Scarlet Witch, but the trio was freed by Blade, and they assisted the Clave in their departure from Earth. Afterwards, Modred sent Wildpride to attack Strange, then followed the sorcerer to his new sanctum in search of Victoria Montesi, who was still pregnant with the incarnation of Chthon. Strange defeated Modred, temporarily negating his mystic power, and teleported him to Thailand. Doctor Strange later exorcised Chthon's presence from Montesi's unborn child.

Modred eventually manages to gather all the pages of the Darkhold, beating the Knights of Wundagore's emissary, Quicksilver, to them. He then returns to Mount Wundagore, kills all the knights and captures Quicksilver. Reading the Darkhold, Modred transferred Chthon into Quicksilver's body, as his soul was trapped within the Darkhold itself, all the while, causing a massive chaos cascade that engulfed the Earth. Once the ritual was complete, the very power of the Darkhold was transferred into Modred's very being and Chthon was resurrected. Outside, they see a new team of Avengers, led by Henry Pym. Though Chthon didn't regard the ragtag team as a threat, Modred was not willing to take any chance. While his master ran around the Earth, altering the effects of the cascade to his will, Modred ambushed the Avengers inside Wundagore. However, he was knocked unconscious by Iron Man.

As part of the All-New, All-Different Marvel, Modred was in Toronto at the time when he was approached by Warrior Woman of Earth-21195. He agreed to grant Warrior Woman whatever she desired. Modred later joined up with the Myriad alongside Warrior Woman.

During the Civil War II storyline, Modred tells Warrior Woman that he paid a visit to Ulysses Cain disguised as Crystal who told him that the Myriad can be enhanced if they can get the Atlanteans on their side. First, Warrior Woman will have to resurrect Namor.

Powers and abilities
Modred's powers are a result of the manipulation of the forces of magic, and possession by the demon Chthon. Modred has superhuman stamina and durability. He has the ability to manipulate magical forces for a variety of effects, including levitation, control of the elements, creation of mystic shields and energy projection. He can also cast any spell contained in the Darkhold. Modred loses both his sanity and his knowledge of magic when no longer possessed by the demon Chthon.

Modred is trained in magical lore, and has an extensive knowledge of magical lore, especially spells contained in the Darkhold, the repository of mystical lore compiled by the demon Chthon.

References

External links
 Modred the Mystic at Marvel.com
 Modred the Mystic at Marvel Wiki
 

Characters created by Bill Mantlo
Characters created by Marv Wolfman
Comics characters introduced in 1975
Fictional British people
Marvel Comics characters who use magic
Marvel Comics superheroes
Marvel Comics supervillains